Dal Bahadur Rana is a member of the Communist Party of Nepal (Unified Marxist-Leninist) who assumed the post of the Minister of Land Reform and Management of Nepal on 25 February 2014 under Sushil Koirala-led government.

In the 2008 Constituent Assembly election he was elected from the Palpa-1 constituency, winning 19185 votes.

His son, Santosh Rana, was a commercial airline co-pilot who was killed on the 2016 Air Kasthamandap crash.

References

Living people
Communist Party of Nepal (Unified Marxist–Leninist) politicians
Nepal MPs 2017–2022
Nepal Communist Party (NCP) politicians
Members of the 1st Nepalese Constituent Assembly
Nepal MPs 1994–1999
1959 births